Pinay Ballers League, abbreviated as PBL, is a women's basketball league based in the Philippines. It was formed in 2014 by Ewon’s Sports Association, Inc., a group of local women's basketball stakeholders, They were led by former Adamson Falcons player Merenciana "Ewon" Arayi, captain of the Philippines women's national basketball team in the 2015 Southeast Asian Games. The PBL aims to give women basketball players, who have played on the national team or in collegiate leagues, a chance to play after college and start a semi-professional career. 

The PiBaLeague is part of an attempt to form a professional women's basketball league in the Philippines, following the now-defunct WPBL, the counterpart of the men's league, Philippine Basketball League.

The league has two divisions. The Elite Division is for players who have finished their collegiate careers. The Developmental division is for players who work for BPOs and call center companies, and those players who are not playing well but have continued playing. The PiBALeague also conducts clinics and outreach programs in the provinces for girls who seek a basketball career. The Philippine Sports Commission supports the League through the Women-in-Sports program.

The funding and operational costs of the league (including officiating, venues, and security) come from the entrance fee of the league's teams and from the league's sponsors, which are small and medium-sized companies including Ever Bilena. 

This league held its most recent tournament during the early quarter of the year 2022. This season had its regulated indoor games after LGU finally allowed sports in the midst of the pandemic. Despite the challenges, it was soundly welcomed by various teams, namely: Philippine Army - Altama Lady Battallion, Philippine Navy Lady Sailors, DLSU Lady Archers, UP Lady Maroons, AdU Lady Falcons, MDC Lady Hogs, and Cavite Lady Hoopers. 

Indeed, it was a sound comeback event for the Philippine women's basketball as they embraced the transitioning post-pandemic games while keeping the most-sought after competition for the lady ballers from both interclub and school-based teams here in the Philippines. While newly-installed Commissioner Manny Ignacio, a long-time advocate of grassroots basketball program, captured the pieces needed to PBL's season-return with a theme, PBL 5v5: "Limahan na!"

See also
Basketball in the Philippines

References

External links
Official Facebook page

2014 establishments in the Philippines
Women's basketball leagues in the Philippines